Eli "Lucky" Thompson (June 16, 1924 – July 30, 2005) was an American jazz tenor and soprano saxophonist whose playing combined elements of swing and bebop. Although John Coltrane usually receives the most credit for bringing the soprano saxophone out of obsolescence in the early 1960s, Thompson (along with Steve Lacy) embraced the instrument earlier than Coltrane.

Early life 
Thompson was born in Columbia, South Carolina, and moved to Detroit, Michigan, during his childhood. Thompson had to raise his siblings after his mother died, and he practiced saxophone fingerings on a broom handle before acquiring his first instrument.  He joined Erskine Hawkins' band in 1942 upon graduating from high school.

Career 
After playing with the swing orchestras of Lionel Hampton, Don Redman, Billy Eckstine (alongside Dizzy Gillespie and Charlie Parker), Lucky Millinder, and Count Basie, he worked in rhythm and blues and then established a career in bebop and hard bop, working with Kenny Clarke, Miles Davis, Gillespie and Milt Jackson.

Ben Ratliff observed that Thompson "connected the swing era to the more cerebral and complex bebop style. His sophisticated, harmonically abstract approach to the tenor saxophone built off that of Don Byas and Coleman Hawkins; he played with beboppers, but resisted Charlie Parker's pervasive influence." He showed these capabilities as sideman on many albums recorded during the mid-1950s, such as Stan Kenton's Cuban Fire!, and those under his own name. He recorded with Parker (on two Los Angeles Dial Records sessions) and on Miles Davis's hard bop Walkin' session. Thompson recorded albums as leader for Disques Vogue (in Paris), ABC Paramount and Prestige and as a sideman on records for Savoy Records with Jackson as leader.

Thompson was strongly critical of the music business, later describing promoters, music producers and record companies as "parasites" or "vultures". This, in part, led him to move to Paris, where he lived and made several recordings between 1957 and 1962. During this time, he began playing soprano saxophone.

Thompson returned to New York, then lived in Lausanne, Switzerland, from 1968 until 1970, and recorded several albums there including A Lucky Songbook in Europe.  He taught at Dartmouth College in 1973 and 1974, then completely left the music business.

Later life 
Thompson's whereabouts after the mid-1970s are unclear; he is believed to have lived briefly on Manitoulin Island in Canada and in Savannah, Georgia.

In his last years, he lived in Seattle, Washington. Acquaintances reported that Thompson was homeless by the early 1990s, and lived as a hermit.

Thompson died from Alzheimer's disease in an assisted living facility on July 30, 2005.

Family 
Thompson was married to Thelma Thompson, who died in 1963. Thompson's son, guitarist Daryl Thompson, played with Peter Tosh and Black Uhuru before embarking on a jazz career in the late 1980s. Thompson also had a daughter, Jade Thompson-Fredericks, and two grandchildren.

Discography

As leader/co-leader
 Accent On Tenor Saxophone  (Urania, 1954; reissued by Fresh Sound)
 Tricotism (ABC-Paramount, 1956)
 Brown Rose  (Xanadu, 1956)
 Lord, Lord, Am I Ever Gonna Know?  (Candid, 1961)
 Lucky Thompson Plays Jerome Kern and No More (Moodsville, 1963)
 Lucky Strikes (Prestige, 1964)
 Lucky Thompson Plays Happy Days Are Here Again  (Prestige, 1965)
 Lucky is Back! (Rivoli, 1965) 
 Soul's Nite Out  (Ensayo, 1970)
 Goodbye Yesterday (Groove Merchant, 1973)
 Concert: Friday the 13th - Cook County Jail (Groove Merchant, 1973) - split album with Jimmy McGriff
 I Offer You (Groove Merchant, 1973)
 Back to the World (51 West, 1979)
 Lucky Thompson (Inner City Jazz Legacy, 1980)
 Lucky Thompson: Sonny Lester Collection (LRC, 1991)
 Paris Blue, with Sammy Price (Concord Jazz, 2000)
 Modern Jazz Group  (EmArcy, no date/Sunnyside, 2000)
 Jazz in Paris, with Dave Pochonet All Stars (Sunnyside, 2001)
 Home Comin (2003)

As sideman
With Louis Armstrong
 Louis and the Angels (Decca, 1957)
With Harry Arnold
 Guest Book (Metronome, 1961)
With Art Blakey
Soul Finger (Limelight, 1965)
With Benny Carter
 A Man Called Adam (Reprise, 1965)
With Kenny Clarke
 Kenny Clarke Plays Pierre Michelot (Columbia, 1957)
With Jimmy Cleveland 
 Introducing Jimmy Cleveland and His All Stars (EmArcy, 1955)
With Johnny Dankworth
 The Zodiac Variations (Fontana, 1964)
With Miles Davis
 Walkin' (Prestige, 1954)
With Dizzy Gillespie
 Afro (Norgran, 1954)
 Dizzy and Strings (Norgran, 1954)
With Milt Jackson
 Meet Milt Jackson (Savoy, 1956)
 Roll 'Em Bags (Savoy, 1956)
 Jackson's Ville (Savoy, 1956)
 Ballads & Blues (Atlantic, 1956)
 The Jazz Skyline (Savoy, 1956)
 Plenty, Plenty Soul (Atlantic, 1957)
With Quincy Jones
 I/We Had a Ball (Limelight, 1964)
With Stan Kenton
 Cuban Fire! (Capitol, 1956)
With John Lewis
 The Modern Jazz Society Presents a Concert of Contemporary Music (Norgran, 1955)
With Thelonious Monk
 Genius of Modern Music: Volume 2 (Blue Note, 1952)
With Oscar Pettiford
 The Oscar Pettiford Orchestra in Hi-Fi (ABC-Paramount, 1956)
 The Oscar Pettiford Orchestra in Hi-Fi Volume II (ABC-Paramount, 1957)
With Ralph Sharon
 Around the World in Jazz (Rama, 1957)
With Martial Solal
 Martial Solal et Son Grand Orchestre (Swing, 1957)
With Dinah Washington
 Mellow Mama (Delmark, 1945 [1992]) Apollo Records recordings

Sources:

References

1924 births
2005 deaths
African-American saxophonists
American expatriates in Switzerland
American jazz tenor saxophonists
American male saxophonists
Bebop saxophonists
Cass Technical High School alumni
Chess Records artists
Count Basie Orchestra members
Dartmouth College faculty
Neurological disease deaths in Washington (state)
Deaths from Alzheimer's disease
Hard bop saxophonists
Nessa Records artists
Musicians from Columbia, South Carolina
Post-bop saxophonists
Prestige Records artists
Xanadu Records artists
Candid Records artists
American expatriates in France
American jazz soprano saxophonists
Homeless people
Swing saxophonists
20th-century saxophonists
American male jazz musicians
Earle Spencer Orchestra members
HighNote Records artists
20th-century American male musicians